The 63rd Division was one of the divisions of the People's Army of the Republic that were organized during the Spanish Civil War on the basis of the Mixed Brigades. Throughout the war it was deployed on the Cordoba front.

History
The unit was created at the end of the summer of 1937. It was made up of the 25th, 86th, and 114th brigades, with their command post in Villanueva de Córdoba. Command of the division fell to Aldo Morandi, with Fritz Schiller as Chief of Staff. At the end of the year it was incorporated into the VIII Army Corps.

In February 1938, Morandi took command of the Extremadura Division, being replaced by José Frías González-Mouvelles. Except for a few sporadic actions, for most of the war the 63rd Division did not take part in significant military operations. In March 1939, after the Casado coup, Ildefonso Castro Ruiz assumed command of the unit. The unit was still on the Córdoba front when it found out about the end of the war.

Command 
 Commanders
 Aldo Morandi;
 José Frías González-Mouvelles;
 Julián del Castillo; 
 Ildefonso Castro Ruiz;

 Commissars
 Kind Vera Jiménez, of the CNT;

 Chiefs of Staff
 Fritz Schiller;
 Enrique Trigo Bru;

Organization

References

Bibliography
 
 
 
 
 

Military units and formations established in 1937
Military units and formations disestablished in 1939
Divisions of Spain
Military units and formations of the Spanish Civil War
Military history of Spain
Armed Forces of the Second Spanish Republic
1937 establishments in Spain
1939 disestablishments in Spain